Aragonite is a carbonate mineral, one of the three most common naturally occurring crystal forms of calcium carbonate,  (the other forms being the minerals calcite and vaterite). It is formed by biological and physical processes, including precipitation from marine and freshwater environments.

The crystal lattice of aragonite differs from that of calcite, resulting in a different crystal shape, an orthorhombic crystal system with acicular crystal. Repeated twinning results in pseudo-hexagonal forms. Aragonite may be columnar or fibrous, occasionally in branching helictitic forms called flos-ferri ("flowers of iron") from their association with the ores at the Carinthian iron mines.

Occurrence

The type location for aragonite is Molina de Aragón in the Province of Guadalajara in Castilla-La Mancha, Spain, for which it was named in 1797. Aragonite is found in this locality as cyclic twins inside gypsum and marls of the Keuper facies of the Triassic. This type of aragonite deposit is very common in Spain, and there are also some in France.

An aragonite cave, the Ochtinská Aragonite Cave, is situated in Slovakia.

In the US, aragonite in the form of stalactites and "cave flowers" (anthodite) is known from Carlsbad Caverns and other caves. For a few years in the early 1900s, aragonite was mined at Aragonite, Utah (now a ghost town).

Massive deposits of oolitic aragonite sand are found on the seabed in the Bahamas.

Aragonite is the high pressure polymorph of calcium carbonate. As such, it occurs in high pressure metamorphic rocks such as those formed at subduction zones.

Aragonite forms naturally in almost all mollusk shells, and as the calcareous endoskeleton of warm- and cold-water corals (Scleractinia). Several serpulids have aragonitic tubes. Because the mineral deposition in mollusk shells is strongly biologically controlled, some crystal forms are distinctively different from those of inorganic aragonite. In some mollusks, the entire shell is aragonite; in others, aragonite forms only discrete parts of a bimineralic shell (aragonite plus calcite). The nacreous layer of the aragonite fossil shells of some extinct ammonites forms an iridescent material called ammolite.

Aragonite also forms naturally in the endocarp of Celtis occidentalis.

Aragonite also forms in the ocean inorganic precipitates called marine cements (in the sediment) or as free crystals (in the water column).
Inorganic precipitation of aragonite in caves can occur in the form of speleothems. Aragonite is common in serpentinites where magnesium-rich pore solutions apparently inhibit calcite growth and promote aragonite precipitation.

Aragonite is metastable at the low pressures near the Earth's surface and is thus commonly replaced by calcite in fossils.  Aragonite older than the Carboniferous is essentially unknown. It can also be synthesized by adding a calcium chloride solution to a sodium carbonate solution at temperatures above  or in water-ethanol mixtures at ambient temperatures.

Physical properties
Aragonite nonetheless frequently forms in near-surface environments at ambient temperatures. The weak van der Waals interactions inside aragonite give an important contribution to both the crystallographic and elastic properties of this mineral. The difference in stability between aragonite and calcite, as measured by the Gibbs free energy of formation, is small, and effects of grain size and impurities can be important. The formation of aragonite at temperatures and pressures where calcite should be the stable polymorph may be an example of Ostwald's step rule, where a less stable phase is the first to form. The presence of magnesium ions may inhibit calcite formation in favor of aragonite. Once formed, aragonite tends to alter to calcite on scales of 107 to 108 years. Comparing to the calcite, aragonite 

The mineral vaterite, also known as μ-CaCO3, is another phase of calcium carbonate that is metastable at ambient conditions typical of Earth's surface, and decomposes even more readily than aragonite.

Uses 
In aquaria, aragonite is considered essential for the replication of reef conditions. Aragonite provides the materials necessary for much sea life and also keeps the pH of the water close to its natural level, to prevent the dissolution of biogenic calcium carbonate.

Aragonite has been successfully tested for the removal of pollutants like zinc, cobalt and lead from contaminated wastewaters.

Claims that magnetic water treatment can reduce scaling, by converting calcite to aragonite, have been met with skepticism, but continue to be investigated.

Gallery

See also
 Aragonite sea
 Ikaite, CaCO3·6H2O
 List of minerals
 Monohydrocalcite, CaCO3·H2O
 Nacre, otherwise known as "Mother-of-Pearl"

References

External links
The Ochtinska Aragonite Cave in Slovakia
 Kosovo Caves Aragonite Formations

Calcium minerals
Carbonate minerals
Cave minerals
Aragonite group
Orthorhombic minerals
Minerals in space group 62
Luminescent minerals
Evaporite